Mainline, Main line, or Main Line may refer to:

Transportation

Railway
Main line (railway), the principal artery of a railway system 
Main line railway preservation, the practice of operating preserved trains on an operational railway network

Asia
India
Ahmedabad–Mumbai main line
Chennai Central–Mysuru main line
Gandhidham–Ahmedabad main line
Howrah–Bardhaman main line
Howrah–Chennai main line, between Chennai and Kolkata
Howrah–Delhi main line
New Delhi–Chennai main line

Japan

Arashiyama Main Line
Chichibu Main Line
Chikuhō Main Line
Chūō Main Line
Eiden Eizan Main Line
Fukushima Rinkai Railway Main Line
Hakodate Main Line
Hankyū Kōbe Main Line
Hankyu Kyoto Main Line
Hankyu Takarazuka Main Line
Hanshin Main Line
Hidaka Main Line
Hiroden Main Line
Hōhi Main Line
Hokuriku Main Line
Kagoshima Main Line
Kansai Main Line
Keihan Main Line
Keikyū Main Line
Keisei Main Line
Kisei Main Line
Kyūdai Main Line
Meitetsu Nagoya Main Line
Mizushima Main Line
Muroran Main Line
Nagasaki Main Line
Nankai Main Line
Nayoro Main Line
Nemuro Main Line
Nippō Main Line
Ohmi Railway Main Line
Ōigawa Railway Ōigawa Main Line
Osaka Monorail Main Line
Ōu Main Line
Rumoi Main Line
San'in Main Line
Sanyo Electric Railway Main Line
San'yō Main Line
Sekihoku Main Line
Senmō Main Line
Shin'etsu Main Line
Sōbu Main Line
Sōtetsu Main Line
Sōya Main Line
Takayama Main Line
Tōhoku Main Line
Tōkaidō Main Line
Toyama Chihō Railway Main Line
Toyohashi Railroad Azumada Main Line
Uetsu Main Line

Korea
Trans-Korean Main Line

Pakistan
Karachi–Peshawar Line, also referred to as Main Line 1

Philippines
PNR North Main Line
PNR South Main Line

Sri Lanka
Main Line (Sri Lanka)

Thailand
Chiang Mai Main Line, between Bangkok and Chiang Mai
Ubon Ratchathani Main Line, between Ban Phachi Junction and Ubon Ratchathani 

Turkey
Adana – Mersin Main Line

Europe
Main Line for Europe

Finland
Finnish Main Line, between Helsinki and Oulu

Germany
Baden main line, between Baden and Constance 

Sweden
Northern Main Line, between Gävle or Storvik and Ånge
Southern Main Line, between Malmö and Katrineholm
Western Main Line, between Stockholm and Gothenburg

United Kingdom
Brighton Main Line
Caledonian main line
Chatham Main Line
Chiltern Main Line
Cornish Main Line
East Coast Main Line
Great Central Main Line
Great Eastern Main Line
Great Western Main Line
Highland Main Line
Main Line Preservation Group, an organisation that eventually became the Great Central Railway heritage railway 
Mainline Freight, a defunct UK railfreight company
Midland Main Line
Midland Mainline, a defunct UK train-operating company
North British Railway Main Line
Penrhyn Main Line class, three narrow-gauge steam locomotives built for the Penrhyn Quarry Railway
South Eastern Main Line 
South Humberside Main Line, between Doncaster and Cleethorpes 
South Wales Main Line
South West Main Line
West Anglia Main Line
West Coast Main Line
Wessex Main Line

North America
United States
Cape Main Line, in Cape Cod, Massachusett
IRT Manhattan Main Line, in New York City
Main Line (Atlantic Coast Line Railroad)
Main Line (Columbus to Chicago), a Pennsylvania Railroad line in Ohio, Indiana, and Illinois
Main Line (Columbus to Indianapolis via Bradford), a Pennsylvania Railroad line in Ohio
Main Line (Pennsylvania Railroad), between Philadelphia and Pittsburgh, Pennsylvania
Main Line (Long Island Rail Road), between Long Island City and Greenport, New York
Main Line (New York to Hoffmans), a nickname for the CSX Hudson Subdivision
Main Line (NJ Transit), formerly part of the Erie Railroad, between Hoboken and Suffern, New Jersey
Main Line (Pittsburgh to St. Louis), a Pennsylvania Railroad line between Ohio and Illinois
Main Line (Reading Company), the former Reading main line between Philadelphia and Pottsville, Pennsylvania
Main Line of Mid-America, a nickname of the former Illinois Central Railroad
Main Line Subdivision, owned by CSX Transportation in Kentucky and Tennessee
Main Street Line (MATA Trolley), a streetcar line in Memphis, Tennessee
Metropolitan main line, a former rapid transit line in Chicago, Illinois
North Side main line, a rapid transit line in Chicago, Illinois
Old Colony Main Line, between Boston, Massachusetts and the South Shore
Old Main Line Subdivision, between Relay (outside Baltimore) and Point of Rocks, Maryland
Park Avenue main line
Philadelphia Main Line
Philadelphia to Harrisburg Main Line, part of the Pennsylvania Railroad Main Line now owned by Amtrak
Philadelphia-to-Washington Main Line
SEPTA Main Line, between West Philadelphia and Lansdale, Pennsylvania
South Side Main Line (Chicago Transit Authority), in Chicago, Illinois
Washington to Atlanta Main Line, owned by Norfolk Southern Railway

Oceania
Australia
Main Line railway, Queensland
South Line, Tasmania, Australia, also called the Main Line
Tasmanian Main Line Company, a privately-owned railway that existed from 1872 to 1890

New Zealand
Canterbury Interior Main Line, a proposed railway on the South Island

Other transport
 Mainline (aeronautics), an airline carrier's non-regional service
 Main Line of Public Works, a package of legislation establishing freight transport between Philadelphia and Pittsburgh
 A toll road system where all vehicles stop at various locations on the highway to pay a toll
 BCN Main Line (Birmingham Canal Navigations Main Line), a canal between Birmingham and Wolverhampton, England
 Ford Mainline, a car model
 South Yorkshire Transport, a large bus operator in South Yorkshire, England which was renamed "Mainline" in 1993

Music
 McKenna Mendelson Mainline, a seminal Canadian blues band
 "Mainline", a song by KISS on their 1974 album Hotter Than Hell
 "Mainline", a 1979 disco song by Black Ivory
 Mainline, a 2014 album by Australian hip-hop collective One Day.

Businesses
 Main Line Broadcasting, a defunct American media company
 Main Line Health, a not-for-profit health system in Philadelphia, Pennsylvania
 Mainline Corporation, former Australian construction company
 Mainline Railways, a model railway brand now owned by Bachmann

Computing
 BitTorrent (software), nicknamed mainline by developers denoting its official origins
 Mainline Linux, the Git repository of Linus Torvalds
 Trunk or mainline, the primary branch of a software project

See also
 Fork (software development) – a software development edition that is not part of the "Mainline" version

Other
 Main line, a primary variation in chess
 Main line (political) (Mainlinie), a historical and political boundary between Northern and Southern Germany, roughly following the River Main
 Mainline Protestant, a group of Christian church denominations
 "Mainlining," a slang term for intravenous drug use
 Philadelphia Main Line, a collection of suburbs of Philadelphia, Pennsylvania

See also

 Central line (disambiguation)
 Mainliner (disambiguation)
 Old Main Line (disambiguation)
 Trunkline (disambiguation)